High School Musical 2: Work This Out! is a musical adventure game that allows the player to play as Sharpay, Troy, Gabriella, Ryan, Chad and Taylor in storylines that extend beyond the High School Musical 2 movie sequel. The game features all 10 songs from High School Musical 2.

Gameplay
The game is much different yet identical to High School Musical: Makin' the Cut! where players can play any of the six main characters of High School Musical 2 and walk around Lava Springs, something players were unable to do in the previous Nintendo DS game.

Some songs are sung by cover artists, and not the original artists, while others are sung by the original artists.

Songs
Songs have to be unlocked to progress through the levels and players can choose which one to play through the jukebox, which will then permanently be playing until the player change the song. You can start off with either, "You Are the Music in Me" or "You Are the Music in Me (Sharpay Version)".

The songs can be heard even if the Nintendo DS is closed.

 What Time Is It?
 Fabulous
 Work This Out
 You Are the Music in Me
 I Don't Dance
 You Are the Music in Me (Sharpay Version)
 Gotta Go My Own Way
 Bet on It
 Everyday
 All for One

Reception

Reception of the game was negative, as GameRankings gave it a score of 36.50% and Metacritic gave it a score of 38 out of 100.

See also
High School Musical
High School Musical 2
High School Musical 3: Senior Year
High School Musical: El desafio (Argentina)

References

External links
IGN page   
    

Nintendo DS games
Nintendo DS-only games
2008 video games
Work This Out
Behaviour Interactive games
Video games developed in Canada
Multiplayer and single-player video games